The Volvo V70 is an executive car manufactured and marketed by Volvo Cars from 1996 to 2016 across three generations.
The name V70 combines the letter V, standing for versatility, and 70, denoting relative platform size (i.e., a V70 is larger than a V40, but smaller than a V90).

The first generation (1996–2000) debuted in November 1996. It was based on the P80 platform and was available with front and all-wheel drive (AWD), the latter marketed as the V70 AWD. In September 1997 a crossover version called the V70 XC or V70 Cross Country was introduced. The sedan model was called Volvo S70.

The second generation (2000–2007) debuted in spring 2000. It was based on the P2 platform and, as with its predecessor, was also offered as an all-wheel drive variant marketed as the V70 AWD and as a crossover version initially called V70 XC. For model year 2003 the crossover was renamed to XC70. The sedan model was called Volvo S60.

The third generation (2007–2016) debuted in February 2007. It was based on the P3 platform and marketed as the V70 and the XC70. Production of the V70 ended on 25 April 2016, the XC70 continued until 13 May 2016. The sedan model was called Volvo S80.

First generation (1996–2000)

The first generation V70 was an improved development on the basis of the Volvo 850 estate. Its overall design became more rounded doing away with the 850's square edges. Among the many changes were a completely revised front end, fully painted bumpers and side trim and clear indicator lenses all around. Most of the interior was redesigned, with new seats, door panels and dashboard. According to Volvo a total of 1800 changes were made.
Standard equipment was improved significantly with remote central locking, heated and electrically adjustable mirrors, two front- and two side airbags, power brakes with ABS and power windows being standard on every car. Trim levels varied for each market as did equipment levels of the most basic trims. In the United States, the badging denoted the engine variant, and to some extent the equipment level, whereas in Europe engines and options could be chosen individually. In all markets more powerful versions received better or upgraded standard equipment. The T5 and R were the series high-performance models.

Small cosmetic and major technical changes were introduced for model year 1999. The Volvo logo on the front grill was redesigned, the square XC-style roof rails replaced the rounded version and black edge stickers on the rear doors were removed. Volvo improved the SRS-system airbags by introducing dual stage deployment logic for the front airbags, and its second generation, side impact protection system side airbag (SIPS-BAG II), whose volume was increased to offer better protection. A whiplash protection system (WHIPS) was also introduced as part of the standard equipment. New engine management systems with drive-by-wire throttle replaced the mechanical throttle on all petrol turbo models. The anti-lock braking system (ABS) was upgraded from a three-channel to a four-channel system, and an upgraded traction control now called STC (Stability Traction Control) was introduced. All-wheel drive models received thicker rear brake discs and redesigned rear calipers. The 4-speed automatic transmissions were upgraded to adaptive shift logic, replacing the previous three-mode selection.

For model year 2000 a new 5-speed automatic transmission with adaptive shift logic was introduced. It was only available on non-turbo, front-wheel drive models and the 2000 V70 R AWD. The naturally aspirated 10V engine was replaced by a detuned 20V variant. Drive-by-wire throttle was introduced for all non-turbo petrol engines. The 2.0L V70 XC was discontinued.

First generation models

V70
The standard V70 was available with a variety of engines, gearboxes and equipment. The standard configuration was front-wheel drive. An all-wheel drive version badged as V70 AWD was available. For some markets Volvo offered a diesel version badged as V70 TDI. In countries such as Italy, with high taxes on cars with more than a 2.0L engine capacity, special petrol models with a 2000 cc engine capacity were offered. This included a 2.0T and a 2.0L T5 version, the latter with a slightly lower power output than the 2.3L variant. An optional third row seat increased occupant capacity from five to seven seats while reducing underfloor storage space in the trunk.

With the V70 Bi-Fuel Volvo continued to offer a factory compressed natural gas (CNG) powered car. A  tank installed in the trunk allowed for a claimed range of  running on CNG only. Due to the bulky tank, rear cargo space was reduced considerably. Drivers could choose whether their car ran on petrol or CNG at the touch of a button. On Bi-Fuel models the temperature gauge in the instrument cluster was replaced by a level gauge for the gas tank. Several options, such as a trip computer and sports suspension, were not available for Bi-Fuel models. Neither Bi-Fuel nor TDI were offered on the North American market.

Specialised vehicles, such as taxi and police versions, were also available directly from the factory. Changes included preparations to install additional equipment, a certified calibrated speedometer, uprated brakes with wear indicators and a different level of standard equipment.

V70 XC
The V70 XC, also referred to as the V70 Cross Country, the V70 AWD Cross Country, or the V70 Cross Country AWD was introduced in September 1997 at the Frankfurt Auto Show for the 1998 model year as a crossover version of the V70. It featured standard all-wheel drive and was available with only two engine and gearbox choices. In the US only the 2.4L turbo engine together with an automatic gearbox was available. A 2.0L version of the V70 XC was available only for markets with high taxes on cars with an engine capacity of more than 2000 cc. Standard ride height was increased  overall with  more ground clearance compared to the regular AWD model.

Visual differences from a standard V70 AWD included a unique front and rear bumper, unpainted sidetrim and sills, a squarer version of the roof rails, a unique front grille and a black decal with white Cross Country lettering across the tailgate. Buyers could also specify a two-tone exterior paint option called Duo Tone. Interior details included thicker floor mats and special canvas/leather upholstery.

V70 R
As the replacement for the popular 850 T-5R and 850 R, the V70 R was unveiled in May 1997. Similar to the previous generation R models it featured a unique leather/Alcantara interior with diamond stitching on the seats. Further styling touches were a special front bumper, blue gauge faces for the instrument cluster, two special colours and special alloy wheels. All US cars were equipped with 16 inch alloy wheels, other markets had 17 inch wheels available at extra cost or as standard equipment. Standard equipment was substantially upgraded over normal models with a few options available such as a trunk mounted CD-changer, Volvo's self developed Road and Traffic Information (RTI) navigation system, or an upgraded stereo system.

Intended to be the high-performance version of the model range, all R models were fitted with the highest performance engines of the line up, and were available in both front-wheel and all-wheel drive with either an automatic or manual transmission. A redesigned suspension with lower ride height and firmer shocks as standard. Three different versions were produced, depending on the model year.

For 1998 the R was available in six colours: Black Stone, Nautic Blue, Silver Metallic, Coral Red, Regency Red, Saffron. All, apart from the first one, were metallic or pearl paints with Saffron only available for the V70 R. Versions offered included FWD and an AWD, both with either a 4-speed automatic or 5-speed manual transmission. The FWD manual transmission equipped R featured a viscous based limited-slip differential. In the US neither FWD nor manual transmissions were offered.

For 1999 the R was available in 8 colours: Black Stone, Classic Red, Nautic Blue Pearl, Silver Metallic, Cassis, Venetian Red Pearl, Dark Olive Green, Laser Blue. All except the first two were metallic or pearl paints with Laser Blue only being available on the R. FWD and manual transmission versions were discontinued, only AWD in combination with a 4-speed automatic were available. Cars were badged V70 R AWD. Power was increased to 250 PS. Blue engine covers were introduced for R models.

For 2000 the R was available in 6 colours: Black Stone, Nautic Blue Pearl, Silver Metallic, Venetian Red Pearl, Dark Olive Green, Laser Blue. The newly introduced 5-speed adaptive automatic was offered but some markets such as Australia, New Zealand and Singapore received the more robust 4-speed auto as used in the 98–99 MY, rear brakes were upgraded to vented discs unique to the R. A dual outlet exhaust ( a first for Volvo ) was fitted as standard with the rear bumper modified to accommodate it. Areo changes  included a reshaped front spoiler with supple black lower air intakes together with recessed spotlights plus a shaped spoiler running the length of the tailgate. The  interior could be ordered in a two-tone design which paired white Alcantara and black leather for the seat covers.

Engines

Engines for the first generation all had five cylinders. The petrol versions were part of the Volvo Modular Engine family, the diesel engines were purchased from VAG.

Safety
A driver airbag was standard on all V70 models, depending on the market a front passenger airbag was either always included or a no-cost option. Buyers could choose to not have a passenger airbag to be able to install a forward facing child seat. Seatbelt pretensioners, with load limiters, for both driver and front passenger were always part of the standard equipment. Side Impact Protection System (SIPS) was standard on all V70 models. Standard side airbags incorporated into the front seats supplemented the system.

Euro NCAP evaluated the S70 (saloon variant of V70) in 1998 awarding it four out of four stars for adult occupant protection. The S70 scored seven of 16 points in the front test and 16 of 16 in the side test. The car received two of two points available in the pole test. The S70 received a total of 25 of 37 points and therefore four stars (25–32) in Euro NCAP's evaluation.

The S70 scored five out of five stars for front impact protection for driver and front passenger in the U.S. National Highway Traffic Safety Administration (NHTSA) safety testing, and four out of five stars for driver and rear passenger side impact protection.

The Insurance Institute for Highway Safety (IIHS) granted the 850/S70 their highest rating of "good" for front crash protection. Rear crash protection was rated as "good". The 1999 model year and later vehicles minimized or prevented whiplash with an energy absorbing seatback hinge mechanism that is standard equipment.

Second generation (2000–2007)

Volvo released the second generation V70 to most markets in early 2000, and for the model year 2001 in North America. The new generation featured adhesively bonded construction as opposed to spot welding in key areas, with Volvo claiming the new body to be 70 per cent more rigid than its predecessor. Critical aspects of the design for the second generation were completed before Ford acquired Volvo in 1999.

With a  increase in width and height, a  longer wheelbase, a slightly shorter overall length than its predecessor, and a slightly increased interior cargo volume, it went on sale in early 2000.

The interior featured raised seating in the second row, a hard point on the passenger's side of the center console to provide support for a range of optional accessories — e.g., an optional shopping bag holder. A rear-seat table, waste basket and cargo net were integrated into the rear seat backs. Standard interior features included a coat hook integrated into the side of the front passenger's headrest, glove compartment with pen holder and toll card, configurable center console and rear seating with a two-position backrest — one favoring cargo — the other favoring comfort.

All P2 platform Volvos received a minor facelift across all markets for 2005. The front fascia was redesigned, tail and head lamps were changed to clear covers, the center console and dashboard received detail changes. Some minor changes were made to the electrical system and some engines, such diesel engine models received a particle filter. A new 6-speed automatic transmission was introduced, available in both AWD and FWD configurations. Production of the second generation V70 and XC70 ended with the 2007 model year.

Styling
The second generation V70 was styled by British designer Peter Horbury, who said "the design challenge involved marrying sports car style at the front with the necessary limitations of a wagon back."
More specifically, he described the concept as the "front end of a Jaguar E-Type married to the back end of a Ford Transit van."

Second generation models

V70
A second generation V70 Bi-Fuel was made available. Unlike previous models the tanks were installed on the underside of the car, keeping all of the trunk space available.
Bi-Fuel models were only sold with the 2.4L (140PS) non-turbo engine, and a choice between a 5-speed manual or a 5-speed automatic transmission.

V70 XC / XC70
At its introduction, the second generation V70 XC received a major upgrade. It featured better ground clearance of  thanks to a raised suspension, different bodywork with unpainted bumpers and fender extensions, and AWD as standard. An interior grab handle for the front passenger was installed only on this model. Early V70 XC featured special rear view mirrors, a feature that was discontinued after 2003.

Engine and gearbox choices were limited. Only the petrol 2.4L low pressure turbo, or the D5 diesel engine with either a 5-speed manual or 5-speed automatic transmission were available. No diesel version was offered for the North American market.

For 2003 the model was renamed the XC70, in keeping with Volvo's newly introduced XC90. Petrol 2.5L low pressure turbo engine replaced the 2.4L low pressure engine.

V70 / XC70 Ocean Race
In 2001, to mark their sponsorship of the just renamed Volvo Ocean Race, special Ocean Race editions of the V70 and V70 XC were announced. Released for model year 2002, the cars came painted only in a unique shade of blue. Silver exterior trim and roof rails, special Ocean Race floor mats as well as assorted badging, set the models apart from non-OR models.

To coincide with the 2005–2006 Volvo Ocean Race, Volvo revived the V70 and XC70 Ocean Race Editions. These were unveiled in early 2005, and once again were painted only in a unique shade of blue. They had upgraded standard equipment and special styling touches such as specific alloy wheels, blue interior trim, leather seats with contrast stitching and Ocean Race badges on the outside.

V70 R
As with the previous generation, Volvo offered a high-performance variant called the V70 R AWD. Based on the PCC2 concept car from 2001, the model was unveiled at the 2002 Paris Motor Show on 26 September. Released in 2003, the model pioneered many firsts for Volvo. This allowed for a  time of 5.9 seconds. The R was available with a M66 six-speed manual or a Aisin AW55 five-speed automatic transmission. The 2005 facelift saw the five-speed automatic replaced by a more modern six-speed unit. Large brakes made by Brembo provided high-performance braking capabilities in line with the car's high-performance characteristics. The V70 R came as standard with Volvo's 4C multi-mode suspension developed with suspension experts Öhlins. The driver could choose from three different settings to vary the car's handling depending on driving style and conditions.

In a 2006 article titled "The Manwagon", The Wall Street Journal linked the V70R to a trend "to lure speed-crazy guys with kids," saying "car makers are trying to transform the dowdy old family hauler into something new," and that "consumer research had unearthed a surprising number of family men who thought wagons could be cool, if only they had more guts."

A total of 3407 V70Rs were shipped to North America: 2004–1,565; 2005–823; 2006–674; 2007–345.

Engines
Engines for the second generation all had five cylinders. The petrol versions were part of the Volvo Modular Engine family. Early model years still used a five-cylinder diesel purchased from VAG which was phased out in favour of Volvo's own five-cylinder diesel from the D5 Engine family.

Second V70 generation engine radiators featured an optional "ozone-eating" catalytic coating, marketed as PremAir, which converted ground-level ozone into pure oxygen during normal vehicle operation. The maximum effect was achieved in urban traffic and strong sunlight.

Safety
Euro NCAP evaluated the S60 (saloon variant of V70) in 2001 awarding it 4 out of 5 stars for adult occupant protection. The S60 scored 10 of 16 points in the front test and 16 of 16 in the side test. The car received two of two points available in the pole test. The S60 received a total of 28 of 37 points and therefore four stars (25–32) in Euro NCAP's evaluation.

The Insurance Institute for Highway Safety (IIHS) evaluated the Volvo S60 (saloon variant). The S60 was granted the IIHS's highest rating of "good" in front and rear tests. The S60 was awarded the Institute's second highest rating of "acceptable" in the side test. However, an improvement in the driver dummy's pelvis/leg rating from "marginal" to "acceptable" would yield an overall "good" rating in the side test.

Third generation (2008–2016)

On 2 February 2007 Volvo debuted the third generation for model year 2008. Based on the Volvo P3 platform it shared numerous elements as well as general styling with the second generation Volvo S80. The high-performance V70R AWD models were discontinued with this third generation, only a mostly cosmetic R-Design package was made available.

After model year 2011, Volvo discontinued sales of the V70 in North America, instead marketing the FWD variant of the XC70.

The Sensus Infotainment System from the Volvo XC60 was made available in 2011 for the V70 and XC70.
For 2012 the V70 and XC70 received a minor facelift. The front received a redesigned bumper with chrome accents, the Volvo logo on the front grill was enlarged. The indicators in the side mirrors were redesigned and changed to LED, and the rear light cluster redesigned. New optional alloy wheels and exterior paint options were added.

Third generation models

V70

V70 Plug-in Hybrid

As part of a joint venture with Vattenfall, a Swedish energy company, Volvo converted two Volvo V70 to diesel-electric plug-in hybrid demonstrators that have been in field testing in Göteborg, Sweden, since December 2009. Vattenfall offered customers participating in this trial a supply of renewable electricity generated from wind or hydropower. This test allowed participants to experience the all-electric range at low temperatures, which has been a disadvantage of plug-in vehicles.

The V70 PHEV test car uses an 11.3 kWh lithium-ion battery pack. The demonstrators were built with a button to allow test drivers to manually choose between electricity or diesel engine power at any time. The first phase of the field trial ended in June 2010 and included 16 families, all employees of Volvo or Vattenfall, who had the car for 1.5 weeks to one month. A second phase of the test was to run from July to December 2010 with Vattenfall employees in Göteborg and Stockholm.

Among the key findings of the first phase are:
Most drivers chose to use electricity in city traffic at lower speeds, but switched to diesel for highway driving.
All of the test drivers charge on a daily basis but none ever used the public charging station installed for the trial.
Before the test trials, drivers were concerned about being a danger to pedestrians and cyclists due to the quietness of the electric-drive vehicle. After the test several of them changed their opinion and said that this issue was less of a problem than expected.

Volvo announced in 2009, and confirmed in 2010, the launch of series production diesel-electric plug-in hybrids as early as 2012. Volvo claimed that its plug-in hybrid could achieve , based on the European test cycle.

Ultimately production of the V70 Plug-in Hybrid did not commence, and the model was never commercially available. Instead, Volvo opted to introduce the V60 PIH in 2012.

XC70
As with previous generation models the XC70 features increased ground clearance, optional all-wheel-drive and some cosmetic differences from the normal V70. On the outside there are XC-only front and rear bumpers, side skirts, wheel arch extensions and additional exterior door trims all in unpainted black plastic. The optional roof rails feature an embossed "XC" and are only available in black. Various unique alloy wheels are offered only for the XC.

For the third generation XC a new feature called hill-descent-control was introduced that limits vehicle speed when driving down a steep embankment.

V70 / XC70 Ocean Race
In 2011 Ocean Race Edition versions of the V70 and XC70 were unveiled to coincide with the 2011–2012 Volvo Ocean Race. All cars featured special interior trim, decor and details. Exterior colours were limited to Ocean Race Blue Metallic or Electric Silver Metallic. Engine choices were limited to the D5 or T6.

For 2014 Ocean Race models were updated with detail changes such as different door sill plates, high gloss black mirror caps and front grill to accompany the 2014–2015 Volvo Ocean Race.

Engines

The V70 and XC70 were available with four-, five- and six-cylinder engines.

Comfort
Third generation V70 and XC70 models initially had Volvo's RTI navigation system available and have included Volvo's Sensus Infotainment System console from model year 2012 onward. As usual with Volvo, front seats and rear bench are of orthopedic design. Dolby Pro-Logic systems are standard, and speaker upgrades and sub-woofers are also available. The standard audio system includes a CD player; optional audio has a USB connector for MP3 players, Bluetooth streaming and the ability to import music files to the car's hard disk. From production week 46 in 2013, map upgrades can be performed by the owner via USB, rather than the previous DVD-based system.

DVD navigation with map data and remote control is standard on higher specifications. Options include a rear seat DVD entertainment system with two headrest monitors, Xenon headlights with headlamp washers, integrated child booster seats, an integrated home link remote control garage door opener, rear-door child-safety locks, front and rear park assist, power-adjustable front seats with 3-position memory and lumbar support, heated front and rear seats, an integrated grocery bag holder, an integrated sunglass holder, a frameless auto-dimming rear view mirror with rear view mirror compass, a power glass moonroof, 12 volt power outlet in the trunk, leather seats, rear tinted windows, rain sensor and an engine block heater. Anti-submarining seats and overhead-mounted seat belt reminder lights come standard. From model year 2014 onward, a TFT dashboard replaced the analogue instruments.

Included as a standard feature beginning in 2007 was the inclusion of Volvo on call roadside assistance for four years, rear window deactivation, safe approach and home safe lighting.

Safety
As standard, the vehicle is equipped with driver, passenger, side and curtain airbags. Also featured is the WHIPS whiplash prevention system on the front seats.

Third generation V70s are available with the BLIS blind-spot sensor system, which can detect a vehicle otherwise hidden from a driver's view because of its position just off to one side of the car.

As is typical for Volvos, all models feature daytime running lights to improve driver visibility. Safety options include active-bending xenon headlights, auto dipping main beam, City Safety (which includes pedestrian and cyclist recognition software), Collision Avoidance, adaptive cruise control and traffic following, driver alertness monitoring and lane departure warning. Traffic sign recognition is also available.

The latest revision of the XC70 includes DSTC (Dynamic Stability and Traction Control), which is standard on all models and combines the functions otherwise known as Electronic Stability Programme and traction control.

Euro NCAP evaluated the V70 in 2007 awarding it 5 out of 5 stars for adult occupant protection. The V70 scored 15 of 16 points in the front test and 16 of 16 in the side test. The car was penalised one point of two points available in the pole test for improper deployment of the curtain airbag in both the original test and the re-test. The V70 was granted an additional two points for seat belt reminders of three available in this category. The V70 received a total of 34 of 37 points and therefore five stars (33–37) in EuroNCAP's evaluation.

Notes

References

External links

V70
Station wagons
Crossover sport utility vehicles
Euro NCAP large family cars
Front-wheel-drive vehicles
All-wheel-drive vehicles
Cars introduced in 1996
Cars introduced in 2000
Cars introduced in 2007
Cars discontinued in 2016
2010s cars